The One Hundred Fourteenth Ohio General Assembly was the legislative body of the state of Ohio in 1981 and 1982. In this General Assembly, the Ohio Senate was controlled by the Republican Party and the Ohio House of Representatives was controlled by the Democratic Party.  In the Senate, there were 18 Republicans and 15 Democrats.  In the House, there were 60 Democrats and 38 Republicans.  It was the final Ohio General Assembly to use legislative Districts from the 1970 United States Census.

Major events

Vacancies
February 1, 1981: Matthew Hachadorian resigns from the 17th House District
November 18, 1982: Representative Benny Bonanno resigns. 
December 13, 1982: Charles Curran resigns from the 6th Senatorial District. 
December 13, 1982: Senator Mike DeWine resigns from the 10th Senatorial District.

Appointments
February 10, 1981: Jeffrey L. Dean is appointed to the 17th House District.
November 18, 1982: Barbara C. Pringle is appointed to the 8th House District.  
December 13, 1982: Tom Fries is appointed to the 6th Senatorial District.  
December 13, 1982: David Hobson is appointed to the 10th Senatorial District.

Senate

Leadership

Majority leadership
 President of the Senate: Paul Gillmor
 President pro tempore of the Senate: Tom Van Meter
 Assistant pro tempore: Stanley Aronoff

Minority leadership
 Leader: Harry Meshel
 Assistant Leader: Neal Zimmers
 Whip: Charles Butts

Members of the 114th Ohio Senate

House of Representatives

Leadership

Majority leadership
 Speaker of the House: Vern Riffe
 President pro tempore of the Senate: Barney Quilter
 Floor Leader: Bill Mallory
 Assistant Majority Floor Leader: Vernon Cook
 Majority Whip: Mary Boyle

Minority leadership
 Leader: Corwin Nixon
 Assistant Leader: Waldo Rose
 Whip: David Johnson

Members of the 114th Ohio House of Representatives

Appt.- Member was appointed to current House Seat

See also
Ohio House of Representatives membership, 126th General Assembly
Ohio House of Representatives membership, 125th General Assembly
 List of Ohio state legislatures

References
Ohio House of Representatives official website
Project Vote Smart – State House of Ohio
Map of Ohio House Districts
Ohio District Maps 2002–2012
2006 election results from Ohio Secretary of State

Ohio legislative sessions
Ohio
Ohio
1981 in Ohio
1982 in Ohio
de:Repräsentantenhaus von Ohio